Rudolf-Ernst Heiland (September 8, 1910 – May 6, 1965) was a German politician of the Social Democratic Party (SPD) and former member of the German Bundestag.

Life 
Heiland was a member of the Parliamentary Council in 1948/49. He was a member of the German Bundestag from its first election in 1949 until his death in 1965.

Literature

References

1910 births
1965 deaths
Members of the Bundestag 1961–1965
Members of the Bundestag 1957–1961
Members of the Bundestag 1953–1957
Members of the Bundestag 1949–1953
Members of the Bundestag for the Social Democratic Party of Germany
Members of the Landtag of North Rhine-Westphalia
Members of Parlamentarischer Rat